Michael Francis Linnan (February 20, 1895 – June 2, 1981) was a player in the National Football League. He first played with the Racine Legion during the 1922 NFL season. After three years away from the NFL, he re-joined the team, by then renamed the Tornadoes, for the 1926 NFL season.

References

1895 births
1981 deaths
American football offensive linemen
Racine Legion players
Racine Tornadoes players
Marquette Golden Avalanche football players
Players of American football from Iowa
People from Pocahontas, Iowa